Water polo events were contested at the 1979 Summer Universiade in Mexico City, Mexico.

References
 Universiade water polo medalists on HickokSports

1979 Summer Universiade
Universiade
1979
1979